General Coffin may refer to:

Clifford Coffin (1870–1959), British Army major general
Isaac Coffin (1801–1872), East India Company major general
Timothy R. Coffin (fl. 1980s–2010s), U.S. Army brigadier general